The Greater Omaha Chamber of Commerce is the chamber of commerce in Omaha, Nebraska. When former United States Federal Reserve Chairman Ben Bernanke spoke to the chamber in 2007, his comments were noted for his continued endorsement of globalization.

In January 2014, the chamber made headlines for organizing a charity effort tied to Denver Broncos quarterback Peyton Manning. According to an article by Time, the chamber partnered with several Nebraska-based businesses that agreed to collectively donate $800 every time Manning said "Omaha" during the AFC Championship football game on January 19, 2014, against the New England Patriots. Manning is known for yelling the city's name at the line of scrimmage prior to plays. According to the article, the $24,800 raised will go to Manning's charity the Peyback Foundation.

See also 
 History of Omaha
 Historic companies in Omaha, Nebraska
 Economy of Omaha, Nebraska

References

External links 
 Omaha Chamber of Commerce Records at the Dr. C.C. and Mabel L. Criss Library

Omaha
Organizations based in Omaha, Nebraska
Economy of Omaha, Nebraska
1893 establishments in Nebraska
Organizations established in 1893